Matrimony Creek is a stream in Rockingham County, North Carolina and Henry County, Virginia.

An 18th-century bachelor named Matrimony Creek because he regarded the stream, like civil marriage, as "noisy, impetuous, and clamorous, though unsullied".

This greenway stretches a little over a mile in each direction, winding through scenic groves of brush, some overhanging for cool shade from harsh summer sun. Towards its western edge, a rushing stream flows as a waterfall converges just below the Center Church street bridge.

See also
List of rivers of North Carolina
List of rivers of Virginia

References

Rivers of Rockingham County, North Carolina
Rivers of Henry County, Virginia
Rivers of North Carolina
Rivers of Virginia